Joachim Karl Ludwig Mortimer Graf von Maltzan (or Maltzahn), Freiherr von Wartenberg und Penzlin (born 1793 at Schloss Lissa; died 1843 in Berlin) was a Prussian diplomat and Foreign Minister from 1841 to 1842.

Maltzan was the son of the Count Joachim Alexander Kasimir Maltzahn and his wife Antoinie (née Hoym). He himself married the Countess Auguste von der Goltz.

Maltzan participated in the War of the Sixth Coalition as an officer in the Prussian Garde du Corps. Then he joined the diplomatic service. At first, he was a legation secretary in various embassies. Later he was the chargé d'affaires in Darmstadt and envoy to The Hague, Hannover and Vienna. Lastly, he had the rank of minister plenipotentiary.

In 1841 Maltzan was made Prussian Foreign Minister. Karl August Varnhagen von Ense reproduced a report by Wilhelm von Humboldt, according to which King Frederick William IV was more satisfied with Maltzan than with any other ministers, and had complete trust and confidence in him. Due to a severe mental illness, however, he was dismissed in 1842.

1793 births
1843 deaths
Mortimer
Prussian diplomats
19th-century diplomats
Foreign ministers of Prussia
Prussian Army personnel of the Napoleonic Wars